Mihály Csábi (born 25 March 1995 in Budapest) is a Hungarian professional footballer who plays for Budapest Honvéd FC. He is the son of former player József Csábi who also spent most of career with Honvéd and earned several caps in the Hungarian national team and subsequently worked as assistant coach for both Honvéd and the Hungarian national team.

Club statistics

Updated to games played as of 1 June 2014.

References
MLSZ 

1995 births
Living people
Footballers from Budapest
Hungarian footballers
Association football midfielders
Budapest Honvéd FC players
Nemzeti Bajnokság I players
21st-century Hungarian people